Edward Hugh Dyneley Nicolls  was a British colonial official and engineer, who served as the Director of Public Works in several British colonies.

He was educated at Bloxham School. He was appointed Director of Public Works in British Cyprus in 1904, and served in that position until 1919. He was invested as an Officer of the Order of the British Empire in 1918. He was invested as a Companion of the Order of St Michael and St George in 1927, while serving as Director of Public Works in Gold Coast.

References

Date of birth unknown
Date of death unknown
British civil engineers
British colonial officials
Companions of the Order of St Michael and St George
Officers of the Order of the British Empire
People educated at Bloxham School
British Cyprus people
Gold Coast (British colony) people